Littleton Waller Tazewell Bradford (1848–1918) was a Virginia politician and a co-founder of Pi Kappa Alpha Fraternity.

Biography
Bradford, a cousin of fellow Pi Kappa Alpha founder Frederick Southgate Taylor, was born in Norfolk, Virginia on July 16, 1848 to Edmund Bradford and Anne Elizabeth (Tazewell) Bradford). Bradford's surname was changed from Bradford to Tazewell when the Virginia legislature gave him permission to adopt the name of his distinguished maternal grandfather, Littleton Waller Tazewell, who was Governor of Virginia and one of the state's most revered leaders in 19th century politics, but who had no male heir. This change was made after Bradford's days at the Virginia Military Institute (VMI) and at the University of Virginia, where records show him as "T. Bradford" or "L.W.T. Bradford".

Bradford was educated first at Norfolk Academy, then he was sent to be a cadet at VMI on February 6, 1865 where and he was assigned to the class of 1868. At this time, VMI had been moved from Lexington to Richmond. His cadetship lasted only two months until April 1865, when the corps was disbanded as Federal troops moved on Richmond and the capture of the Confederate capital was imminent. The cadets were directed to escape the best way possible and Bradford escaped in a canal boat taking refuge with relatives further up the James River.

Bradford entered the University of Virginia prior to his five co-founders. He shared Lawn Room 47 with his cousin, Frederick Southgate Taylor. At the University he studied medicine but dropped out and entered business in Norfolk.

For almost a half a century, Bradford (now known by the surname Tazewell) was active in business and civic life in the city of Norfolk. His avocations were farming and rowing. He was founder of the Chesapeake Boat Club, where he assembled an all-Pi Kappa Alpha crew. For twenty years, Tazewell was on the Norfolk City Council. He had been asked to run for mayor, but he declined.

Tazewell married his wife, the former Mary Louise Walke (1856–1923) on November 6, 1883.  He died on July 15, 1918 and is interred in the family square in Elmwood Cemetery, near the grave of his cousin Frederick Southgate Taylor. A monument gives simple details of birth, marriage and death.

External links

1848 births
1918 deaths
Politicians from Norfolk, Virginia
University of Virginia alumni
Pi Kappa Alpha founders
Tazewell family
Virginia city council members